The 1939 Little All-America college football team is composed of college football players from small colleges and universities who were selected by the Associated Press (AP) as the best players at each position. For 1939, the AP selected both a first team and a second team.

First team
QB - Lloyd Madden, Colorado Mines
HB - Sam Hammerstrom, Union (NY)
HB - Tony Canadeo, Gonzaga
FB - Leroy Zimmerman, San Jose State
E - Sherrill Busby, Troy (AL)
E - Jack Mulkey, Fresno State
T - Jack Gregory, Chattanooga
T - Mike Kostiuk, Detroit Tech
G - Marion Rogers, Maryville (MO)
G - Frank Loughney, La Salle
C - Bulldog Turner, Hardin-Simmons

Second team
QB - Tom Harding, Butler
HB - Leo Wisneski, Central Teachers
HB - Kenneth Heineman, Texas Mines
FB - Joe Enzler, Portland
E - Neal Allen, Mercer
E - Jim Reiser, Ohio Wesleyan
T - Paul Debruhl, Newberry
T - Marvin Katzenstein, Colorado Mines
G - Dick Lindner, Trinity (CT)
G - Stanley Radjunas, Morehead
C - Ralph Schlosser, Gonzaga

See also
 1939 College Football All-America Team

References

Little All-America college football team
Little All-America college football teams